Meißen Altstadt station is a railway station in the town of Meissen, Saxony, Germany. The station lies on the Borsdorf–Coswig railway.

References

Railway stations in Saxony
Railway stations in Germany opened in 2013
MeissenAltstadt
Altstadt